Atractus eriki is a species of snake in the family Colubridae. The species is endemic to Venezuela.

Etymology
The specific name, eriki, is in honor of Erik La Marca (born 1990), who is the youngest son of Venezuelan herpetologist Enrique La Marca.

Geographic range
A. eriki is native to the western slope of the Cordillera de Mérida in the western Venezuelan states of Mérida, Táchira, and Trujillo.

Habitat

Reproduction
A. eriki is oviparous.

References

Further reading
Esqueda LF, La Marca E, Bazó S (2005). "Un nuevo colúbrido fossorial del género Atractus (Dipsadinae) de la vertiente lacustre de Los Andes de Venezuela". Herpetotropicos 2 (2): 87–93. (Atractus eriki, new species). (in Spanish, with an abstract in English).
Natera Mumaw, Marco; Esqueda González, Luis Felipe; Castelain Fernández, Manuel (2015). Serpientes de Venezuela: Una Vision Actual de su Diversidad. Santiago de Chile: Dimacofi Negocios Avanzados S.A. 456 pp. (in Spanish).
Rivas GA, Molina CR, Ugueto GN, Barros TR, Barrio-Amorós CL, Kok PJR (2012). "Reptiles of Venezuela: an updated and commented checklist". Zootaxa 3211: 1–64.
Wallach V, Williams KL, Boundy J (2014). Snakes of the World: A Catalogue of Living and Extinct Species. Boca Raton, London, New York: CRC Press, an Imprint of the Taylor & Francis Group. 1,237 pp. . (Atractus eriki, p. 72).

Atractus
Reptiles of Venezuela
Endemic fauna of Venezuela
Reptiles described in 2007